Yahoo! Tech is a technology news web site operated by Yahoo!.

Former Yahoo! Tech
The site, which was the first new product from the Santa Monica, California-based Yahoo! Media Group, featured a selection of original, licensed, and user-generated content, along with product ratings and reviews for thousands of tech products across 19 product categories. Plus, the site could be personalized using its "My Tech" feature, which allows users to save products that they own and would like to research in the future.

The site's original content included a weekly web-based reality show called Hook Me Up, where Yahoo! users got a tech makeover—as well as four featured "Yahoo! Tech Advisors," who blogged about how gadgets and current technology affect their lives from the four very different demographic segments (The Mom, The Techie Diva, The Working Guy, and the Boomer.) Yahoo! Tech's content partners included Consumer Reports, Wiley Publishing's For Dummies series, and McGraw-Hill; and it incorporated Yahoo!'s community, search, and shopping services.

Former Yahoo! Tech Bloggers
 Gina Hughes
 Christopher Null
 Ben Patterson
 Becky Worley
 Alexander Yoon
 Robin Raskin
 Dory Devlin
 Tom Samiljan

Modern Yahoo! Tech

Re-established Q1 2014, David Pogue, who joined Yahoo! after being asked by CEO Marissa Mayer, and his team deliver news on the changing trends of technology in a jargon-free manner.

External links
Yahoo! Tech site
"Hook Me Up"at Yahoo! Tech
Yahoo! Tech's "Tech Advisors"
A video tour of the web site
Article in Newsweek
Article in The New York Times
Article, in The Los Angeles Times

Tech news|News websites
Computer-related introductions in 2006